Paul John O'Berg (born 8 May 1958) is an English former professional footballer who played as a midfielder in the Football League for Scunthorpe United, Wimbledon, Stockport County and Chester City. He also played in Malta for Naxxar Lions and Sliema Wanderers.

References

1958 births
Living people
Footballers from Kingston upon Hull
English footballers
Association football midfielders
Bridlington Town A.F.C. players
Scunthorpe United F.C. players
Wimbledon F.C. players
Stockport County F.C. players
Chester City F.C. players
Naxxar Lions F.C. players
Sliema Wanderers F.C. players
Leigh Genesis F.C. players
English Football League players